Acinopus striolatus is a species of ground beetle in the subfamily Harpalinae and the only species in the subgenus Acinopus (Haplacinopus).

References

Harpalinae
Beetles described in 1833